Richard Murray (1725?–1799) was an Irish mathematician and academic, who spent his whole career Trinity College Dublin (TCD), serving both as Erasmus Smith's Professor of Mathematics (1764-1795) and Provost (1795-1799).

Career
Richard Murray was born in County Down, to William Murray (merchant). He matriculated at TCD on 30 May 1743, aged 16, and was a Scholar there in 1745.  He was awarded BA (1747), MA and Fellow (1750), BD (1759), and DD (1762).  He was Donegall Lecturer in Mathematics (1762–1764), and then became the second Erasmus Smith's Professor of Mathematics (1764-1795). He was also Librarian, was appointed Vice-Provost in 1782, and served as Provost from 1795 until his death.

He is perhaps best remembered for his book Artis logicæ compendium (S. Hooper, 1773), "In usum juventutis collegii Dubliniensis", which was translated in 1852 by John Walker as Murray's Compendium of Logic.

References

1720s births
1799 deaths
Donegall Lecturers of Mathematics at Trinity College Dublin
Irish mathematicians
People from County Down
Provosts of Trinity College Dublin
Year of birth uncertain